The Diamond Dogs Tour was a concert tour by English singer-songwriter David Bowie in North America in 1974 to promote the studio album Diamond Dogs (1974).  The first leg of the tour utilized a rock opera-style stage show format with multiple sets, costume changes and choreography. The remainder of the tour was alternatively known as The Soul Tour, which included some songs from the forthcoming album Young Americans (1975) and featured a revamped, stripped-down presentation and different backing band.

Tour preparation and details

Two months of rehearsals were required to get the tour ready, in part due to the elaborate set & props required for the show (reported to cost $275,000 per set, or about $ today). Originally the tour was planned to appear in a city for five nights before moving on to the next city, but that plan was abandoned early on. The tour started in June 1974 in Montreal, Quebec as the "Diamond Dogs Tour" (although producer Tony DeFries demanded the tour be referred to as "The Year of the Diamond Dogs" when speaking with the press). Bowie recorded radio and television commercials for the tour, which played in advance of the tour's arrival in each city. The tour took the month of August 1974 off, during which time Bowie began recording his follow-up studio album, Young Americans. On 10 October 1974, after the tour had resumed, Bowie abandoned the extravagant theatrical set and re-branded the tour "The Soul Tour", which would continue through the end of the North American leg in December.

In 1987, Bowie recalled how difficult the tour was early on before changing it into the 'Soul Tour', saying "I was in a bad state of mind to have attempted that. It was pretty exciting, but I was so blocked [laughs], so stoned during the entire thing that I'm amazed I lasted with it even that one trip across America before I ditched it."

Set design
The set for the theatrical Diamond Dogs tour was designed by Mark Ravitz, who would go on to design sets for artists such as KISS, Whitney Houston and the Backstreet Boys, as well as for Bowie's 1987 Glass Spider Tour. The set was built to resemble a city (called "Hunger City"), weighed 6 tons and incorporated over 20,000 moving parts including a variety of props (such as streetlamps, chairs and catwalks). The props themselves weren't ready for use until a mere 6 days before the show opened, which led to a variety of technical problems during the tour: a movable catwalk collapsed once during the tour with Bowie on it. The set was at least partially based on work by German artist George Grosz. In 1990, while preparing for his Sound+Vision Tour, Bowie recalled the difficulties faced by the show, saying it "was good fun and dangerous, with the equipment breaking down and the bridges falling apart on stage. I kept getting stuck out over the audience's heads, on the hydraulic cherry picker, after the finish of 'Space Oddity.'"

Other props worked as expected: for the song "Big Brother", Bowie sang while atop a multi-mirrored glass "asylum", emerging during the next song ("Time") sitting in the palm of a giant hand covered in small light bulbs.

The show in Tampa, Florida, was performed without any of the stage props because the truck driver driving those components ended up in a highway ditch after being stung by a bee.

In 1987, while preparing for the Glass Spider Tour (which picked up theatrically where the Diamond Dogs tour left off and was also designed by Ravitz), Bowie recalled about the extraordinary nature of the set he used during this tour, saying "We had four skyscrapers on stage, with bridges that went backwards and forward and would go up and down. The whole thing was built on a city pretext. I had dancers working with me and it was choreographed and was a real fantastic musical event. I thoroughly enjoyed working like that."

Live recordings

MainMan, Bowie's management team, planned to cull a live album from the July 1974 performances at the Tower Theater just outside Philadelphia.  When the band learned of this, they demanded to be paid a standard recording fee of $5000 per musician in addition to their normal pay or they would refuse to perform. They were given checks hours before show time, and the concert recording went on as planned.  The resulting double album, titled David Live, became Bowie's first official live album.

A Portrait in Flesh, a bootleg of the 5 September 1974 show in Los Angeles was released in Australia.  An official version of the 5 September 1974 show, mixed by Tony Visconti in 2016, was first released as Cracked Actor (Live Los Angeles '74), a 3-LP set, for Record Store Day on 22 April 2017. The set was released in CD and digital formats in June 2017.

An official live album mostly recorded at the Michigan Palace, Detroit on 20 October 1974, during the last stage of the tour – known as The Soul Tour – was released for Record Store Day in August 2020. The 2-LP and 2-CD set is titled I'm Only Dancing (The Soul Tour '74). In September 2020, I'm Only Dancing (The Soul Tour '74) peaked at #16 on the Billboard Top Rock Albums chart and #12 on the Billboard Top Alternative Albums chart.

Band

June–July:
David Bowie – vocals
Michael Kamen – electric piano, Moog synthesizer, oboe, music director
Earl Slick – guitar
Mike Garson – piano, mellotron
David Sanborn – alto saxophone, flute
Richard Grando – baritone saxophone, flute
Herbie Flowers – bass
Tony Newman – drums
Pablo Rosario – percussion
Gui Andrisano – backing vocals
Warren Peace – backing vocals

September:
David Bowie – vocals
Michael Kamen – electric piano, Moog synthesizer, oboe
Mike Garson – piano, mellotron
Earl Slick – guitar
Carlos Alomar – rhythm guitar
David Sanborn – alto saxophone, flute
Richard Grando – baritone saxophone, flute
Doug Rauch – bass
Greg Errico – drums
Pablo Rosario – percussion
Gui Andrisano – backing vocals
Warren Peace – backing vocals
Ava Cherry – backing vocals
Robin Clark – backing vocals
Anthony Hinton – backing vocals
Diane Sumler – backing vocals
Luther Vandross – backing vocals

"The Soul/Philly Dogs Tour" – October–December:
David Bowie – vocals
Mike Garson – piano, mellotron, music director
Earl Slick – lead guitar
Carlos Alomar – rhythm guitar
David Sanborn – alto saxophone, flute
Emir Ksasan – bass
Dennis Davis – drums
Pablo Rosario – percussion
Warren Peace – backing vocals
Ava Cherry – backing vocals
Robin Clark – backing vocals
Anthony Hinton – backing vocals
Diane Sumler – backing vocals
Luther Vandross – backing vocals

Timeline

Tour dates
Two concerts were performed on 16 June in Toronto.

Songs

From David Bowie
 "Space Oddity"
 "Memory of a Free Festival"
From The Man Who Sold the World
 "The Width of a Circle"
From Hunky Dory
 "Changes"
From The Rise and Fall of Ziggy Stardust and the Spiders from Mars
 "Moonage Daydream"
 "Suffragette City"
 "Rock 'n' Roll Suicide"
From Aladdin Sane
 "Watch That Man"
 "Aladdin Sane (1913–1938-197?)"
 "Drive-In Saturday"
 "Panic in Detroit"
 "Cracked Actor"
 "Time"
 "The Jean Genie"
From Pin Ups
 "Sorrow" (originally by The McCoys in 1965 and made famous by The Merseys the following year; written by Bob Feldman, Jerry Goldstein and Richard Gottehrer)

From Diamond Dogs
 "Future Legend"
 "Diamond Dogs"
 "Sweet Thing"
 "Candidate"
 "Sweet Thing (Reprise)"
 "Rebel Rebel"
 "Rock 'n' Roll With Me"
 "1984"
 "Big Brother"
 "Chant of the Ever Circling Skeletal Family"
From Young Americans
 "Young Americans"
 "Win"
 "Somebody Up There Likes Me"
 "Can You Hear Me?"
Other songs
 "All the Young Dudes" (from All the Young Dudes (1972) by Mott the Hoople; written by Bowie)
 "Footstompin'" (from "Foot Stomping” by The Flares (1961), written by Aaron Collins)
 "Here Today, Gone Tomorrow" (from Observations in Time (1969) by the Ohio Players, written by Leroy Bonner, Joe Harris, Marshall "Rock" Jones, Ralph "Pee Wee" Middlebrooks, Dutch Robinson, Clarence "Satch" Satchell and Gary Webster)
 "It's Gonna Be Me" (outtake from Young Americans; released as a bonus track from the album's 1991 and 2007 reissues (the latter being an alternate version with strings))
 "John, I'm Only Dancing (Again)" (a rearranged version of a non-album Bowie single first released in 1972/1973, a studio version of which was itself later released as a single in 1979)
 "Knock on Wood" (originally from Knock on Wood (1966) by Eddie Floyd; written by Floyd and Steve Cropper; later released as a single from David Live (1974))

Notes

David Bowie concert tours
1974 concert tours